The Tejano Music Award for Songwriter of the Year is an honor presented to songwriters within the Tejano music market. The Tejano Music Awards, first bestowed in 1981, was established to recognize the most talented performers of the genre—a subcategory of regional Mexican music, with roots in the music of early European settlers in Texas. The awards are presented by the Texas Talent Musicians Association (TTMA), to "promote excellence in the Tejano music industry" using the popular vote method to select the winner of best songwriter of the year. The award was established by Rick Trevino, a Tejano performer, who founded the Awards in 1981.

The award was first presented to Carlos Cadenas in 1981 and last awarded to Joe Lopez in 1992. Luis Silva is the most awarded songwriter, winning the award for seven consecutive years starting in 1983. The award was removed following a dispute between Sony Discos, Freddie Records, Fonovisa, and TH-Rodven, with the Tejano Music Awards, who noticed EMI Latin's artists winning most of the categories at the 1990 and 1991 Tejano Music Awards. The record labels prevented La Mafia and Joe Lopez from attending and receiving their awards at the 1992 Tejano Music Awards despite the association's overhaul of the awards months prior to the event.

Recipients

See also 

Music of Texas

References

General

Specific

Works cited

 - Read online, registration required

1981 establishments in the United States
1993 disestablishments in the United States
S
Awards established in 1981
Awards disestablished in 1993
Songwriting competitions